Tina George (born November 5, 1978) is a retired American freestyle wrestler who won a gold medal at the 2003 Pan American Games. She was second at the 2002 and 2003 world championships, both times losing to Saori Yoshida.

George stopped competing after the 2008 U.S. Olympic Trials, and served 18 months with the U.S. Army in Iraq, where she was seriously wounded. She made a brief comeback for the 2012 U.S. Olympic Trials, and retired for good on April 22, 2014.

References

1978 births
Living people
African-American sport wrestlers
World Wrestling Championships medalists
Pan American Games gold medalists for the United States
Pan American Games medalists in wrestling
Wrestlers at the 2003 Pan American Games
American female sport wrestlers
Medalists at the 2003 Pan American Games
21st-century African-American sportspeople
21st-century African-American women
20th-century African-American sportspeople
20th-century African-American women
20th-century African-American people